John Forbes (born October 21, 1956) is the Iowa State Representative from the 44th District. A Democrat, he has served in the Iowa House of Representatives since 2013.

, Forbes serves on several committees in the Iowa House – the Commerce, Local Government, Transportation, and Ways and Means committees.  He also serves as a member of the Health and Human Services Appropriations Subcommittee.

Forbes was born in Clarion, Iowa, and raised in Eagle Grove, Iowa. He has been a small business owner for over 32 years. He is a pharmacist and owns and operates Medicap Pharmacy in Urbandale, Iowa.

Electoral history
*incumbent

Organizations
Forbes is a member of the following organizations:
 Member and past president of the Urbandale Chamber of Commerce
 Board member for the Urbandale Library Foundation Board
 Des Moines Area Metropolitan Advisory Committee
 Past president of the Iowa Pharmacy Association
 Past president of the Polk County Pharmacists Association

Honors and awards
Forbes received the Bowl of Hygenia Award from the Iowa Pharmacy Association in 2010 for his work in community service. In 2011, he won the Hero's of the Heartland Award from the American Red Cross.

Family
Forbes and his wife Cindy reside in Urbandale, Iowa. Together they have two children, Adam and Meredith. He is the son-in-law of former Iowa Secretary of Agriculture Dale M. Cochran.

References

External links

 Representative John Forbes official Iowa General Assembly site
 
 Financial information (state office) at the National Institute for Money in State Politics

1956 births
Living people
Democratic Party members of the Iowa House of Representatives
People from Urbandale, Iowa
21st-century American politicians